ASML Holding N.V. (commonly shortened to ASML, originally standing for Advanced Semiconductor Materials Lithography) is a Dutch multinational corporation founded in 1984. ASML specializes in the development and manufacturing of photolithography machines which are used to produce computer chips.  it is the largest supplier for the semiconductor industry and the sole supplier in the world of extreme ultraviolet lithography (EUV) photolithography machines used to manufacture the most advanced chips. As of 2023, ASML was the most highly valued European tech company by market capitalization with about US$270 billion.

Products
ASML produces the photolithography machines used in the production of computer chips. In these machines, patterns are optically imaged onto a silicon wafer that is covered with a film of light-sensitive material (photoresist). This procedure is repeated dozens of times on a single wafer. The photoresist is then further processed to create the actual electronic circuits on the silicon. The optical imaging that ASML's machines deal with is used in the fabrication of nearly all integrated circuits and, as of 2011, ASML had 67 percent of the worldwide sales of lithography machines. 

ASML's competition consisted of Ultratech, Canon and Nikon, MKS Instruments,  Lam Research and Cadence Design Systems.

Immersion lithography
Since immersion lithography was developed by Burn-Jeng Lin, ASML cooperated with Taiwan Semiconductor Manufacturing (TSMC). In 2004, TSMC began commercial production of 90 nanometer semiconductor nodes using ASML immersion lithography. As of 2011, their high-end TWINSCAN NXT:1950i system was used for producing features down to 32 nanometres at up to 200 wafers per hour, using a water immersion lens and an argon fluoride laser that produces light at a wavelength of 193 nm. , an average lithography machine cost .

DUV lithography
Deep ultraviolet (DUV) lithography devices from ASML use light that penetrates the UV spectrum to print the tiny features that form the microchip's structure. 

In 2009, the IMEC research center in Belgium produced the world's first functional 22 nm CMOS Static random-access memory memory cells with a prototype EUV lithography machine. In 2011 series-produced (non-prototype) EUV machines were shipped.

EUV lithography
ASML manufactured extreme ultraviolet lithography machines that produce light in the 13.3–13.7 nm wavelength range when a high-energy laser is focused on microscopic droplets of molten tin to produce a plasma, which then emits EUV light. As of 2021, their best selling product has been Twinscan NXE:3600D, using EUV at 13.5nm; costing €144 million, or $150 million; shipping the machine requires 40 shipping containers, 20 trucks and three Boeing 747s. The goal is to manufacture the most advanced semi-conductors at below 5 nm towards 2 nm.

Nanoimprint lithography
In addition to immersion-based lithography and EUV lithography, ASML has a substantial intellectual property portfolio covering imprint lithography.

Company
ASML's corporate headquarters is in Veldhoven, Netherlands and the location for research, development, manufacturing and assembly. ASML employs more than 31,000 people from 120 nationalities and relies on a network of more than 4,600 tier 1 suppliers. ASML has a worldwide customer base and over sixty service points in sixteen countries. It has offices in the Netherlands, the United States, Belgium, France, Germany, Ireland, Israel, Italy, the United Kingdom, China, Taiwan, Hong Kong, Japan, Malaysia, Singapore, and South Korea.

In 2020, it employed 28,000 people. The company is listed on both the AEX and NASDAQ Stock Exchanges, as ASML. It is also a component of the Euro Stoxx 50 and NASDAQ-100.

History
The company, originally named ASM Lithography, is named ASML, as its official name and not an abbreviation and was founded in 1984 as a joint venture between the Dutch companies Advanced Semiconductor Materials International (ASMI) and Philips. Nowadays it is a public company. When the company became independent in 1988, it was decided that changing the name was not desirable, and the abbreviation ASML became the official company name.

In 1997, ASML began studying a shift to using extreme ultraviolet and in 1999 joined a research consortium including Intel, two other U.S. chipmakers, as well as the US Department of Energy. It collaborated with the Belgian Imec and Sematech and turned to Carl Zeiss in Germany for its need of mirrors.

In 2000, ASML acquired the Silicon Valley Group (SVG), a US lithography equipment manufacturer, in a bid to supply 193 nm scanners to Intel Corp.

At the end of 2008, ASML experienced a large drop in sales, which led management to cut the workforce by about 1000 worldwide, mostly contract workers and to apply for support from the Dutch national unemployment fund to prevent even larger layoffs. Two and a half years later, ASML expected a record-high revenue.

In July 2012, Intel announced a deal to invest $4.1 billion into ASML in exchange for 15% ownership, in order to speed up the transition from 300 mm to 450 mm wafers and further development of EUV lithography. This deal was without exclusive rights to future ASML products and, as of July 2012, ASML was offering another 10% of the shares to other companies. As part of their EUV strategy, ASML announced the acquisition of DUV and EUV sources manufacturer Cymer in October 2012.

In November 2013, ASML paused development of 450 mm lithography equipment, citing uncertain timing of chipmaker demand.

In 2015, ASML suffered intellectual property theft. A number of employees had been found stealing confidential data from its Silicon Valley software subsidiary that develops software for machine optimization.

In June 2016, ASML announced their plans to acquire Taiwan-based Hermes Microvision Inc. for about $3.1 billion to add technology for creating smaller and more advanced semiconductors.

In 2018, the Trump administration tried to block the sale of ASML technology to China, but as of 2021, the 2020–present global chip shortage as well as the "technological cold war" between the US and China has been a business opportunity for ASML.

In November 2020, ASML revealed that it had acquired the German optical glassmaking firm Berliner Glas Group in order to meet increasing need for components for its EUV systems.

In July 2021, Thierry Breton European Commissioner, visited ASML and announced a goal of at least 20% of world production of semiconductors in Europe by 2030, and support via a European Alliance on semiconductors.
After reporting earnings in July 2021, the company said they had a near monopoly for machines used by TSMC and Samsung Electronics to make the advanced chips.

In February 2023, ASML claimed that a former worker in China stole information about the company's technology. This wasn't the first time that ASML was allegedly linked with an intellectual property breach connected to China, and this latest breach came in the midst of the US-China trade war, which is also called "chip war".

In March 2023, the Dutch government announced measures that will place restrictions on chip exports in order to protect national security. This measure affected ASML as one of the most important companies in the global microchip supply chain.

Finances

Shareholder

Awards
 The IEEE Spectrum Emerging Technology 2018 Award to Dutch company ASML for its Extreme Ultraviolet Lithography system. ASML is currently the top supplier of photolithography systems to the semiconductor industry.

 In the category for Popular Prize, Vadim Banine received the 2018 European Inventor Award for shaping the future of microchip manufacturing.

 The largest independent microelectronics research center in Europe is called IMEC (Interuniversity Micro Electronics Centre). Martin van den Brink of ASML was given the 2019 IMEC Lifetime of Innovation Award.

 The Netherlands Association for Investor Relations (NEVIR), where listed companies and professionals in investor relations had the chance to be recognized for their outstanding work in the sector, presented awards to ASML in the categories: "Best Company in the field of Investor Relations" during the Dutch IR Awards 2019 annual award ceremony.

 ASML received the SEMI Americas Award at the 2020 edition of the microelectronics conference SEMICON West for its collaborative approach to extreme ultraviolet lithography (EUV), which helped it become commercially viable and opened the door to new technological possibilities.

 The Preferred Quality Supplier (PQS) Award for 2020 has been awarded to ASML, which is pleased to announce it. ASML has attained a level of performance that continuously surpasses Intel's expectations for the commitment to continual quality improvement.

 The Dutch Innovation Prize 2021 was awarded to ASML at the 4th National BID AVROTROS Innovation Dinner held at Kasteel Wittenburg in Wassenaar.

 ASML received the first CoSta Award for the most successful and impactful innovative partnership between a corporate company and a startup.

References

External links

 "The Silicon Age: Trends in Semiconductor Devices Industry", 2022

Electronics companies of the Netherlands
Equipment semiconductor companies
Nanotechnology companies
Technology companies of the Netherlands
Multinational companies headquartered in the Netherlands
Holding companies of the Netherlands
Companies based in North Brabant
Veldhoven
Computer companies established in 1984
Electronics companies established in 1984
Holding companies established in 1984
Technology companies established in 1984
Dutch companies established in 1984
Companies formerly listed on Euronext Amsterdam
Companies listed on Euronext Amsterdam
Companies in the Euro Stoxx 50
Companies listed on the Nasdaq
Dutch brands
Photonics companies